The Football's On is a British television panel show broadcast on BT Sport and presented by Ian Stone with Doc Brown among others as a regular panelist.

References

External links

2010s British sports television series
2020s British sports television series
2014 British television series debuts
BT Sport
English-language television shows